The 1967 Mediterranean Games, officially known as the V Mediterranean Games, and commonly known as Tunis 1967, were the 5th Mediterranean Games. The Games were held in Tunis, Tunisia over 9 days, from 8 to 17 September 1967, where 1,249 athletes (1,211 men and 38 women) from 11 countries participated. For the first time, women took part in the games. There were a total of 93 medal events from 14 different sports.

Participating nations
The following is a list of nations that participated in the 1967 Mediterranean Games:

Sports
The second Mediterranean Games sports program featured 93 events in 14 sports. The numbers in parentheses represent the number of medal events per sport.

Medals

References

 Serbian Olympic Committee

See also
International Mediterranean Games Committee
Mediterranean Games Athletic results at gbrathletics website

 
Mediterranean Games
M
Multi-sport events in Tunisia
Mediterranean Games
Sports competitions in Tunis
Mediterranean Games by year
20th century in Tunis
September 1967 sports events in Africa